Jimeoin: Over the Top is an Australian reality, comedy and stand-up comedy television series starring English born Irish comedian Jimeoin, and created by Jimeoin with producer and The Comedy Channel programming director Darren Chau. The series features Jimeoin touring across the top of Australia, as well as special performances at the iconic Sydney Opera House, the Famous Spiegeltent, Jimeoin's Cooking Show filmed at the Adelaide Fringe Festival and a special episode in New Zealand. Jimeoin: Over the Top premiered on The Comedy Channel on 6 May 2010, and ranks among the top five highest-rating local productions in the Comedy Channel's history.

References

External links
 

Australian comedy television series
The Comedy Channel original programming
2010 Australian television series debuts